Colliuris elegans is a species of ground beetles in the genus Colliuris found in Brazil.

Note that Colliuris elegans Vanderl., 1829, is a synonym for Collyris elegans, a species found in Java.

References

External links

Lebiinae
Beetles described in 1855
Insects of Brazil